Rostollan is a surname. Notable people with the surname include: 

Louis Rostollan (1936–2020), French road bicycle racer
Thomas Rostollan (born 1986), French road bicycle racer